The sixth season of the original Mission: Impossible originally aired Saturdays at 10:00–11:00 pm (EST) on CBS from September 18, 1971 to February 26, 1972.

Cast

Episodes

References

6
1971 American television seasons
1972 American television seasons